This is a list of electoral results for the Northern Province in Victorian state elections.

Members for Northern Province

Election results

Elections in the 1970s

|- style="background-color:#E9E9E9"
! colspan="6" style="text-align:left;" |After distribution of preferences

Elections in the 1960s

 Preferences were not distributed.

 Preferences were not distributed.

 Two party preferred vote was estimated.

Elections in the 1950s

References

Victoria (Australia) state electoral results by district